Christopher Davies (24 July 1952 – 14 February 2002) was a South African cricketer. He played in eighteen first-class and four List A matches for Border from 1971/72 to 1981/82.

See also
 List of Border representative cricketers

References

External links
 

1952 births
2002 deaths
South African cricketers
Border cricketers
Cricketers from East London, Eastern Cape